Janvrin Island is a Canadian island off the coast of Cape Breton Island Nova Scotia in Richmond County.
Janvrin Island, named for the family of John Janvrin, a merchant trader of Jersey, Channel Islands, is connected by a bridge to neighbouring Isle Madame. Janvrin Island was used by the Mi'kmaq Indians as a summer hunting ground and was especially prized for the white skinned deer who prospered there.  For this reason, they called it "The Isle of the White Stag."

Janvrin Island is also known to have some of the highest tides in the world and evidence of the water erosion can be seen high up on the white cliffs on the island.

References

External links
Website

Islands of Nova Scotia
Landforms of Richmond County, Nova Scotia